TBD is an American digital multicast television network owned by the Sinclair Broadcast Group. Launched on February 13, 2017 and aimed at teenagers and young adults ages 16 to 34, the network focuses on internet-based series and other digital content (including showcases of user-generated music, animation and comedy videos, eSports, and compiled half-hour and hour-long episodes of short-form web series), along with some feature films. The following article is a list of current, upcoming and past programs aired by the network, organized in alphabetical order by title and including the dates of their syndication runs on TBD.

Current programming

Unscripted series
 Because Science (February 13, 2017–present) – Nerdist Industries-produced series featuring explanations of the science and physics behind fandom and fantasy figures; hosted by Kyle Hill
 Best of the Week (February 13, 2017–present) – a showcase of the week's best viral videos compiled from the Jukin Media sites FailArmy, Jukin' Video, The Pet Collective and People are Awesome
 This Week in Fails (February 13, 2017 – November 7, 2018, first-run; November 10, 2018–present, reruns) – FailArmy's showcase of epic fails (e.g. stunt mishaps and general blunders) caught on videotape
 TBD Fitness (February 13, 2017–present) – hour-long weekly program featuring health tips and exercise instruction compiled from various online fitness video channels
 TBD Food (February 14, 2017–present) – hour-long weekly program featuring recipes and culinary-themed story segments compiled from various food-focused online video channels
 While You Were... (February 14, 2017 – November 7, 2018, first-run; November 10, 2018–present, reruns) – recaps of the week's top online news stories and viral video compilations from Jukin' Video; hosted by Rick Carrera and Ashley Chavez (originally Ricardo Marquez and Ellyse O'Halloran)
 10 Up (February 15, 2017–present) – series from ZoominGames featuring information and "top ten lists" covering online gaming and eSports; hosted alternatingly by either TamTu Bui, Callum Stamp or Denise Doornebosch
 Big Red Lazor (February 15, 2017–present) – a hybrid talk show and video game competition produced by ZoominGames; hosted by TamTu Bui, Callum Stamp and Denise Doornebosch
 Pranks Network After Dark (August 30, 2017–present) – half-hour program featuring compilations of practical jokes from various YouTube pranksters.
 FBE: React (November 13, 2017–present) – half-hour compilation program of the Fine Brothers-produced video series featuring reacting to viral videos, trends, film trailers, or music videos.
 FBE: React Gaming (November 17, 2017–present) – half-hour compilation program of the Fine Brothers-produced video series featuring reacting to videos game.
 The Extreme World of Devin Super Tramp (November 27, 2017–present) – half-hour compilation program featuring adventure and extreme sport videos shot by videographer Devin Graham.
 FBE: Try Again (November 29, 2017–present) – half-hour compilation program of the Fine Brothers-produced video series featuring challenges undertaken by different groups of people.
 What's Trending on TBD (March 6, 2018–present) – a compilation series recapping the week's top pop culture and trending news stories from What's Trending; hosted by Shira Lazar along with other What's Trending correspondents
 The Laboratory with CRH (July 18, 2018–present) – half-hour compilation program of videos from the YouTube channel of Taras Kulakov (better known as CrazyRussianHacker), including science experiments, survival hacks and product reviews.
 Corridor Digital: Maxed Out! (July 30, 2018–present) – half-hour compilation program featuring special-effects driven sci-fi, action, and comedy videos produced by visual effects firm Corridor Digital.
 FailArmy Presents: The Flop (November 14, 2018–present) – FailArmy's half-hour series featuring viewer comments read by the show's hosts as well as fails and amazing caught-on-tape moments
 FailFactory (May 17, 2019–present) – FailArmy half-hour series featuring themed viral fail videos
 Outside TV Shorts (June 3, 2019–present) – a half-hour compilation series featuring outdoor sports clips (ranging from two to six minutes in length) available on Outside TV's Outside TV Shorts app
 FBE: People vs. Food (June 5, 2019–present) – half-hour compilation program of the Fine Brothers-produced React Channel series featuring React cast members and FBE staffers trying unusual and foreign foods or engaging in eating challenges.
 The Link (April 11, 2020–present) - a compilation of viral videos, starting at one and linking to another, hosted by Lorena Abreu.

Scripted series
 Dust (July 5, 2018–present) – an hour-long compilation series of science fiction-based short films from independent filmmakers
 CollegeHumor's Hardly Working (January 11, 2019–present) – a compilation series of the satirical workplace-based shorts centered in the offices of the College Humor website
 CollegeHumor Presents (January 11, 2019–present) – a compilation series of comedy sketches produced by CollegeHumor

Former programming

Compilation programs from The QYOU
 QYOU EDGE (February 13, 2017 – September 17, 2018) – a showcase of weird, wacky, and gritty web videos presented during TBD's overnight hours
 QYOU PRIME (February 13, 2017 – September 17, 2018) – early evening presentations of trending online videos and undiscovered features
 QYOU UP (February 13, 2017 – September 17, 2018) – morning presentations of inspiring and inspirational videos and music
 QYOU ZONE (February 13, 2017 – September 17, 2018) – an early-afternoon showcase of "the wildest, funniest, hottest web videos on the planet"

Scripted series
 The Lizzie Bennet Diaries (February 13, 2017 – March 24, 2018) – comedy series inspired by the Jane Austen novel Pride and Prejudice
 Emma Approved (February 14, 2017 – March 25, 2018) – comedy series inspired by the Jane Austen novel Emma
 Frankenstein, MD (February 15–May 31 and October 10–December 8, 2017) – comedy/science series loosely inspired by the Mary Shelley novel Frankenstein.
 MyMusic (November 29, 2017 – September 4, 2018) – a Fine Brothers-produced mockumentary series (packaged as both half-hour full-length and compilation episodes) centering on a group of co-workers in a transmedia music production company.

Unscripted series
 Titansgrave (February 14–November 7, 2017 and March 27–August 26, 2018) – Wil Wheaton and guests highlight and play tabletop role-playing games
 Spellslingers (February 17–November 5, 2017 and August 28, 2018–April 26, 2019) – host Sean Plott and celebrity guests battle in rounds of Magic: The Gathering
 TableTop (February 17, 2017 – April 26, 2019) – Wil Wheaton and guests highlight and play various tabletop games
 Caters TV Presents (July 5, 2017 – May 27, 2019) – half-hour program produced by Caters News Agency, featuring trending videos and short-form news clips
 Seeker Now (November 6, 2017 – August 25, 2018) – a half-hour science and technology news program featuring content sourced from the Group Nine Media web channel.
 Escape! (March 30, 2018 – January 25, 2019) – half-hour escape room competition program hosted by actress/comedienne Janet Varney, in which teams of four celebrities work together to solve complex puzzles and riddles
 The Look: All Stars (June 24, 2018 – August 26, 2018) – an hour-long beauty makeover competition hosted by Tori Spelling and produced by Dreamventure Productions, in which two teams of beauty and fashion experts conduct "real-world and aspirational transformations".
 Nerdist Presents: Set List (August 29, 2018 – January 27, 2019) – a half-hour series in which comedians are challenged to perform improvised stand-up routines, described as "stand-up without a net," based upon topics provided to them on the spot.
 Cheddar Explains (February 4–May 4, 2019) – half-hour program produced by Cheddar, which takes a look at questions about technology and the economy.
 The Baeble Block Party (March 28–May 2, 2019) – a condensed, one-hour version of the Baeble Music series featuring behind-the-scenes looks at Baeble-produced concerts, music sessions and artist interviews.

References

TBD